Hillary Beyer (September 28, 1837 – September 24, 1907) was an American soldier who fought in the American Civil War and received the U.S. military's highest decoration, the Medal of Honor, for his actions at the Battle of Antietam on September 17, 1862.

Biography
Beyer enlisted in the 90th Pennsylvania Infantry in September 1861  He earned the Medal of Honor while a 2nd Lieutenant during the Battle of Antietam, for staying on the open field and carrying another soldier, James H. Gouldy, to safety in a rear area.  He later received an injury at the Battle of the Wilderness on May 5, 1864, but remained on active duty until his discharge in November of that year.

Beyer died on September 24, 1907 and is buried in Lower Providence Township, Montgomery County, Pennsylvania.

Medal of Honor citation

See also

List of American Civil War Medal of Honor recipients: A–F

References

1837 births
1907 deaths
People of Pennsylvania in the American Civil War
Union Army officers
United States Army Medal of Honor recipients
American Civil War recipients of the Medal of Honor